Anhalt-Bitterfeld is a district in Saxony-Anhalt, Germany. Its capital is Köthen (Anhalt).

History 

This district was established by merging the former districts of Bitterfeld, Köthen and a large part of Anhalt-Zerbst as part of the reform of 2007.

Former Verwaltungsgemeinschaft 

 Osternienburg, disbanded in 2010.
 Raguhn, disbanded in 2010.

Towns and municipalities

The district Anhalt-Bitterfeld consists of the following subdivisions:

References

 
History of Anhalt
2007 establishments in Germany
Former states and territories of Saxony-Anhalt